Uzbekistan participated at the 2018 Asian Para Games which was held in Jakarta, Indonesia from 6 to 13 October 2018. Uzbekistani delegation was composed of 53 athletes who competed in 5 sports, namely powerlifting, judo, shooting, swimming and athletics. In July 2019, Uzbekistan was stripped from 2 gold medals (one from judo and one from athletics) due to doping violation.

Medals by sport

Medals by day

See also
 Uzbekistan at the 2018 Asian Games

References

Nations at the 2018 Asian Para Games
2018 in Uzbekistani sport